Mikindani (Mji wa kale wa Mikindani in Swahili) is a historic coastal town located in Mtwara-Mikindani District of Mtwara Region in Tanzania. The name comes from the Swahili word mikinda which means "young coconut trees". Therefore the term "Mikindani', literally means "the place where there are young coconut trees" in old Swahili language. Mikindani is part of the city of Mtwara and is governed by the Mtwara Mikindani Municipal Council. The site is a registered National Historic Site.

History

There is evidence of habitation in Mikindani from the ninth century during the peak of the Swahili period. After the Portuguese in the 16th century and then Omani conquest it regained its former status as a centre of trade in southern Tanzania during the eighteenth and nineteenth centuries. The original inhabitants (the Makonde people) became Swahilized by the ninth Century AD. A further influx of Arabs occurred in the 19th century under the reign of Seyyid Said, the graves and mosques from this period can still be seen.

In the late 19th century under German colonial rule trade in the area's natural resources of rubber, sisal, coconuts and oil seed grew. The boma (fort), a slave market, a prison and a dock were constructed in the village. During World War I the prison was largely destroyed, what remained was turned into a customs house. With the arrival of the British at the end of the First World War, Mikindani remained an important administrative post and attracted a sizeable Indian population (there is still an Indian temple) until 1947 when the British administration developed the port in neighbouring Mtwara for exporting peanuts grown as part of the infamous Tanganyika groundnut scheme. 

As the centre for trade and administration moved to Mtwara, Mikindani's focus shifted back to fishing and agriculture. Due to its proximity to the Northern border of Mozambique and the lack of communications - the road to Dar es Salaam was still under construction - the whole area remained relatively unexplored; the area was off-limits to tourists during the 1977 - 1994 Mozambican Civil War. 

The town is home to 'Livingstone House', that owes its name to the fact that the town is assumed to be the point of departure of Livingstone's last expedition. The building as such never housed Livingstone, and was erected long after his departure. It is likely that Livingstone's final departure point would in fact have been nearby Pemba on the northern side of the mouth of the lagoon rather than this location in the centre of Mikindani.

After local administrative offices moved to Mtwara in 1947, Mikindani's fortunes declined. However, the town has since seen an increase in prosperity in recent years, starting with the renovation of the boma as a hotel in the late 1990s.

Geography

Mikindani town is located on the gently sloping hills of the southern coast of Mikindani Harbour, a small roughly heart shaped natural harbour off Mikindani Bay.  The southern arm of the harbour mouth contains a small collection of houses (and a holiday complex) called Litingi. On the far side of the mouth is a small village called Pemba. There are salt pans located just past the mouth of the bay, on the ocean side.

Economy 
The Town is located on the main Mtwara-Lindi road, about 10km from Mtwara. The main economic activity in Mikindani is trade at 84% of the adult population engaging in the activity,  followed by 12.4% of the residents working in small scale agriculture.

Images of Mikindani

See also
Historic Swahili Settlements

References

External links
Tanzania Tourist Board - Mikindani
Swahili people
Swahili city-states
Swahili culture
Populated places in Mtwara Region